Piano Sonata No. 18 may refer to: 
Piano Sonata No. 18 (Beethoven)
Piano Sonata No. 18 (Mozart)
Piano Sonata in G major, D 894 (Schubert)